Jewel Ponferada (born July 8, 1988) is a Filipino professional basketball player for the Rain or Shine Elasto Painters of the Philippine Basketball Association (PBA). He was selected 13th overall in the 2012 PBA draft by the San Mig Coffee Mixers.

College career 
Ponferada played for the NU Bulldogs. He mostly played center during his stay there, but also played power forward. He made a game-winning triple with 2.9 seconds left to prevent the Adamson Falcons from immediately claiming a spot in the Final Four.

Professional career

San Mig Coffee Mixers (2012–2013) 
Ponferada was drafted by the Mixers along with big men Aldrech Ramos and Gian Chiu. He was able to win a championship during his time there in the 2013 Governors' Cup. Before the following conference, he was traded to Globalport.

Globalport Batang Pier (2013–2015) 
The Globalport Batang Pier acquired Ponferada with a 2017 second round pick. On August 16, 2015, Ponferada and a 2015 second round pick (who later turned out to be Simon Enciso) was traded by the Batang Pier to the Rain or Shine Elasto Painters in exchange for Jervy Cruz.

Rain or Shine Elasto Painters (2015–present) 
In the 2015–16 Philippine Cup, Ponferada registered career-highs of 18 points and 13 rebounds. In the Commissioner's Cup, he won a championship with Rain or Shine. During the Governor's Cup, he was suspended for one game for committing two flagrant fouls against the Mahindra Enforcers. 

In the 2016–17 Philippine Cup, he posted a new career-high of 22 points, while also grabbing 9 rebounds. The following Philippine Cup, he made five of his seven attempts from three-point range to finish with 17 points, 3 rebounds, and a block in a win against the San Miguel Beermen.

Before the 2021 Philippine Cup, Ponferada's contract was extended. He scored 17 points to lead the team in a loss to the Northport Batang Pier.

On May 19, 2022, Ponferada signed a two-year extension with the team.

PBA career statistics

As of the end of 2022–23 season

Season-by-season averages

|-
| align=left | 
| align=left | San Mig Coffee
| 14 || 3.9 || .538 || – || .000 || .9 || .1 || – || .1 || 1.1
|-
| align=left | 
| align=left | GlobalPort
| 20 || 10.7 || .549 || – || .571 || 2.9 || .4 || .2 || .3 || 3.4
|-
| align=left | 
| align=left | GlobalPort
| 28 || 13.9 || .333 || – || .520 || 3.8 || .3 || .1 || .4 || 2.3
|-
| align=left | 
| align=left | Rain or Shine
| 53 || 16.7 || .500 || .385 || .758 || 3.6 || .8 || .3 || .5 || 6.4
|-
| align=left | 
| align=left | Rain or Shine
| 37 || 13.7 || .448 || .296 || .623 || 3.2 || .5 || .2 || .7 || 4.8
|-
| align=left | 
| align=left | Rain or Shine
| 39 || 14.0 || .472 || .297 || .741 || 3.4 || .7 || .3 || .4 || 5.9
|-
| align=left | 
| align=left | Rain or Shine
| 48 || 13.4 || .387 || .300 || .589 || 2.7 || .6 || .3 || .4 || 4.5
|-
| align=left | 
| align=left | Rain or Shine
| 12 || 14.3 || .451 || .083 || .654 || 3.2 || .8 || .3 || .5 || 5.3
|-
| align=left | 
| align=left | Rain or Shine
| 22 || 11.8 || .368 || .400 || .649 || 2.3 || .7 || .2 || .6 || 4.6
|-
| align=left | 
| align=left | Rain or Shine
| 31 || 11.5 || .407 || .244 || .533 || 2.3 || .8 || .2 || .2 || 4.1
|-class=sortbottom
| align=center colspan=2 | Career
| 305 || 13.2 || .441 || .304 || .645 || 3.0 || .6 || .2 || .4 || 4.6

References

External links 
PBA.ph profile

1988 births
Living people
Filipino men's basketball players
Power forwards (basketball)
Centers (basketball)
Magnolia Hotshots players
NU Bulldogs basketball players
People from Borongan
Basketball players from Eastern Samar
NorthPort Batang Pier players
Rain or Shine Elasto Painters players
Magnolia Hotshots draft picks